The 1946 Miami Seahawks season was the inaugural (and only) one for the franchise and the first for the All-America Football Conference. Head coach Jack Meagher led the team to a 3–11 finish, fourth out of four teams in the Eastern Division.

The team's statistical leaders included Marion Pugh with 608 passing yards, Jimmy Nelson with 163 rushing yards, Lamar Davis with 275 receiving yards, and Dick Erdlitz with 34 points scored (22 extra points, two field goals, and one touchdown).

Rookie guard Buddy Jungmichel was selected by both the United Press and the AAFC as a second-team guard on the 1946 All-AAFC football team.

Regular season

Schedule

Standings

Roster
Players shown in bold started at least one game at the position listed as confirmed by contemporary game coverage.

References

Miami Seahawks
1946
Miami Seahawks